Beerburrum Road is a continuous  road route in the Moreton Bay and Sunshine Coast local government areas of Queensland, Australia. It is designated as part of State Route 60. It is a state-controlled district road (number 127), rated as a local road of regional significance (LRRS).

Route description
It runs north, passing Pumicestone Road to the north-east and Old Gympie Road to the north-west. It leaves Caboolture and passes through  before entering , where it turns north-east, passes the exit to Beerburrum–Woodford Road to the west, and crosses the North Coast railway line. It continues to the north and then east as it reaches the Glass House Mountains Road (Steve Irwin Way) where it ends.

Land use along the road is mainly rural.

Road condition
The road is fully sealed, and most of it is two lane road.

Upgrade projects
A lead project to improve safety on sections of this road and Burpengary–Caboolture Road, at a cost of $28.8 million, was under construction in July 2022, with two sub-projects on this road already completed.

History

The Caboolture area was colonised by European people in 1842 when the land around the Moreton Bay penal colony was opened up to free settlers. By the mid-1860s farms had been established and the local pastoralists were experimenting with sugar cane and cotton.

In 1890 it became a railway siding known by its position on the line rather than a name, and in 1902 it was officially named Elimbah.

Some European settlement in what is now the locality of Beerburrum had occurred from 1861, but it was not until 1890 when the railway arrived that the area became accessible for new settlers. In 1916, Beerburrum was chosen to be a soldier settlement with over 550 farms allocated. Beerburrum Soldier Settlement was the largest soldier settlement in Queensland.

This road was part of the Bruce Highway when it was declared in 1934, and remained so until August 1970, when the Caboolture Bypass Stage 2 was completed between Bribie Island Road and Red Road.

Major intersections
All distances are from Google Maps. The road is within the Moreton Bay and Sunshine Coast local government areas.

See also

 List of road routes in Queensland
 List of numbered roads in Queensland

Notes

References

Roads in Queensland